Jamshedpur Football Club is a professional association football club based in Jamshedpur, India, that plays in Indian Super League. The club was formed in 2017 and played its first competitive match on 18 November 2017, and hold NorthEast United FC 0–0 tie.

List of Players
The list includes all the players registered under an Jamshedpur FC contract. Some players might not have featured in a professional game for the club.

Notable foreign internationals

 Tim Cahill

List of overseas players
The list includes all the overseas players registered under an Jamshedpur FC contract. Some players might not have featured in a professional game for the club.

References

Lists of Indian Super League players
Lists of association football players by club in India
Jamshedpur FC players
Jamshedpur-related lists
Association football player non-biographical articles